Cathedral Basilica of Saint Peter in Chains is a Catholic cathedral of the Latin Church in the Archdiocese of Cincinnati. The basilica is a Greek revival structure located at 8th and Plum streets in downtown Cincinnati, Ohio in the United States. It is dedicated to Saint Peter's imprisonment and liberation. 

The church's cornerstone was laid on May 20, 1841, under the direction of then-bishop—later archbishop—John Baptist Purcell, and the church was formally dedicated on November 2, 1845, as the first large church west of the Allegheny Mountains. On June 29, 2020, Pope Francis conferred the title of minor basilica on St. Peter in Chains.

Architecture

The interior of St. Peter in Chains is distinctly unique among Roman Catholic cathedrals in America, with its Greek-themed mosaics depicting the Stations of the Cross, its ornate Corinthian columns and its massive bronze doors. The crucifix is by Benvenuto Cellini, the murals by Carl Zimmerman and the mosaic in the apse is the work of Anton Wendling.

History
The first Catholic church in Cincinnati was Christ Church, originally located at Liberty and Vine streets, then later at 6th and Sycamore streets, at what is now the site of St. Francis Xavier Church. Christ Church served as the young diocese's de facto cathedral until the first St. Peter's Cathedral was built on the site. St. Peter's was dedicated on December 17, 1826, becoming the seat of the diocese.

The second and current St. Peter's Cathedral was dedicated in 1845. The large stone angels that flanked the main altar were created by Odoardo Fantacchiotti in the late 1840s.  They were among the first European sculptures to come to Cincinnati and now grace the Cincinnati Art Museum.

By the 1930s, St. Peter in Chains had become dilapidated, its signature white limestone covered in soot. In 1938, Archbishop John T. McNicholas moved the archdiocesan seat from St. Peter in Chains to the more modern St. Monica's in the Clifton Heights neighborhood north of downtown. St. Peter in Chains deteriorated further as an ordinary parish church. In the mid-1950s, under Archbishop Karl Joseph Alter's urban-renewal program and in accordance with the city's master plan, St. Peter in Chains underwent significant restoration and expansion. Architect Edward J. Schulte designed new transepts, a rectory, a sacristy, and archdiocesan offices. The church was re-dedicated as a cathedral on November 3, 1957, amid celebration and fanfare.

In 1977, the cathedral hosted a visit from Polish Archbishop Karol Wojtyla, who the following year became Pope John Paul II. To date, more than two dozen Roman Catholic bishops have been consecrated within its walls, and the cathedral is a popular venue for weddings, as well as the annual ordination of the archdiocese's priests and deacons.

See also

List of Catholic cathedrals in the United States
List of cathedrals in the United States

References

External links

Official Cathedral Site
Archdiocese of Cincinnati Official Site

National Register of Historic Places in Cincinnati
Roman Catholic churches in Cincinnati
Peter, Z
Limestone churches in the United States
1845 establishments in Ohio
Cincinnati Local Historic Landmarks
Basilica churches in Ohio